Thysanoplusia orichalcea, the slender burnished brass, is a moth of the family Noctuidae. The species was first described by Johan Christian Fabricius in 1775. It is a polyphagous pest of vegetable crops that originated in Indonesia, from where it spread to Europe, South Asia, India, Sri Lanka, Africa, Australia and New Zealand. In northern Europe it is a migrant species.

Description

The wingspan is 36–44 mm. Its head, collar and the vertex of its head are reddish orange. Tegulae and forewings pale reddish brown. The forewings are extensively covered with a metallic golden shimmering surface. Only the costal field and hem are brown. Sub-basal, antemedial and postmedial waved lines very indistinct, fine and whitish in colour. The sub-marginal line irregularly lunulate. The reniform and orbicular tain are small and white bordered. The unpatterned hindwings are grey brown, somewhat darker at the margin. The thorax is furry and with some hair tufts, the proboscis is well developed.

Larva bluish green with a few short dorsal hairs. There are slender dorsal white lines and a prominent lateral line.

Ecology
The moth flies from August to October, depending on the location.

The larvae feed on various herbaceous plants, including crops such as sunflower, Coreopsis, potato and soybean. In managing their population, phenylacetaldehyde, a volatile floral compound attractive to many Lepidoptera and present in Canada thistle (Cirsium arvense), was found to be effective in trapping especially the females of the species.

Gallery

References

External links

 "73.004 BF2433 Slender Burnished Brass Thysanoplusia orichalcea (Fabricius, 1775)". UKMoths. Retrieved January 23, 2019.

"09078 Thysanoplusia orichalcea (Fabricius, 1775) - Südliche Goldeule". Lepiforum e.V. Retrieved January 23, 2019.

Plusiinae
Moths described in 1775
Agricultural pest insects
Owlet moths of Africa
Moths of Australia
Moths of Cape Verde
Moths of the Comoros
Owlet moths of Europe
Moths of Japan
Moths of Madagascar
Moths of Mauritius
Moths of the Middle East
Moths of New Zealand
Moths of Réunion
Moths of Asia
Taxa named by Johan Christian Fabricius